The Samsung SGH-M310 is a cellular phone manufactured by Samsung.

It was marketed as cheap with elegant shapes.

The SGH-M310 mobile phone comes with FM radio, a VGA camera, and a MP3 decoder.

The phone was mainly released in Europe and Samsung only lists it in its German site.

References

Mobile phones introduced in 2008
M310